Fosser is a village in the municipality of Aurskog-Høland, Norway. Its population (2007) is 578. Fosser had a station on the Urskog-Hølandsbanen from the opening of the Hølandsbanen in 1898 and until the line was closed down in 1960.

The village derives its name from the local waterfall (waterfall = foss in Norwegian). The waterfall flows from the lake "Øversjøen" into "Fossersjøen" this lake is locally known for large Pike.

Villages in Akershus
Aurskog-Høland